Sphecodes ephippius is a Palearctic species of sweat bee.

References

External links
Images representing  Sphecodes ephippius 

Hymenoptera of Europe
Halictidae
Insects described in 1767
Taxa named by Carl Linnaeus